A pseudoconsensus is a false consensus, reached most commonly when members of a group feel they are expected to go along with the majority decision, as when the voting basis is a large supermajority and nothing can be done unless some of the members of the minority acquiesce. This can cause problems such as the Abilene paradox. Robert's Rules of Order notes that this was part of the impetus for switching from consensus to majority as the voting basis in the British House of Lords:

The book Creating a Life Together: Practical Tools to Grow Ecovillages identifies pseudoconsensus as a problem that can occur in communal environments with a consensus voting basis. Various forms of pseudoconsensus identified were the Big League Complex; Decision by Endurance; Everyone Decides Everything; and "I Block, I Block!"

See also
Consensus decision-making
False-consensus effect
Groupthink
Pluralistic ignorance

References

Consensus